The pepper-box revolver or simply pepperbox (also "pepper-pot", from its resemblance to the household pepper shakers) is a multiple-barrel firearm, mostly in the form of a handgun, that has three or more gun barrels in a coaxially revolving mechanism.  Each barrel holds a single shot, and the shooter can manually rotate the whole barrel assembly to sequentially index each barrel into alignment with the lock or hammer, similar to rotation of a revolver's cylinder.

Pepperbox guns have existed for all types of firelock firearms and metal cased ammunition systems used in breechloading  firearms: matchlock, wheellock, flintlock, caplock, pinfire, rimfire, and centerfire. While they are usually sidearms, a few long guns were also made.  For example, Samuel Colt owned a three-barrel pepperbox matchlock musket from British India, and an eight-barrel pepperbox shotgun was designed in 1967 but never went into production.

Early years

This type of firearm was popular in North America from 1830 until the American Civil War, but the concept was introduced much earlier. In the 15th century, Ribauldequin,  a version of the Volley gun had several single shot barrels were attached to a stock, being fired individually by means of a match. Around 1790, pepperboxes were built on the basis of flintlock systems, notably by Nock in England and "Segallas" in Belgium. These weapons building on the success of the earlier two barrel turnover pistols, were fitted with three, four or seven barrels. These early pepperboxes were hand rotated.

The invention of the percussion cap building on the percussion powder innovations of the Rev. Alexander Forsyth's patent of 1807 (which ran until 1821), and the industrial revolution allowed pepperbox revolvers to be mass-produced, making them more affordable than the early handmade guns previously only seen in the hands of the rich.
Examples of these early weapons are the American three barrel Manhattan pistol, the English Budding (probably the first English percussion pepperbox) and the Swedish Engholm. Most percussion pepperboxes have a circular flange around the rear of the cylinder to prevent the capped nipples being accidentally fired if the gun were to be knocked while in a pocket, or dropped and to protect the eyes from cap fragments.

Popularity
The pepperbox, or at least the firearm that is mostly associated with this term, was invented in the 1830s and was intended for civilian use, but military officers often made private purchases for their own use. The design spread rapidly in the United States, the United Kingdom and some parts of continental Europe. It was similar to the later revolver in that it contained bullets in separate chambers in a rotating cylinder. Unlike the revolver, however, each chamber had its own barrel, making a complex indexing system unnecessary (though pepperboxes with such a system do exist). Originally these pistols were muzzle loaders, but in 1837 the Belgian gunsmith Mariette invented a hammerless pepperbox with a ring trigger and turn off barrels that could be unscrewed.

A few percussion pepperboxes were still hand rotated but most have a mechanism that rotates the barrel group as the hammer is cocked for each shot. Single-action versions were made, notably by Darling of Massachusetts, but the vast majority use the self-cocking system whereby pressing the trigger rotates the barrel block, cocks the hammer and finally fires the weapon. The main producer of self-cocking top hammer pepperboxes (mostly referred to as "bar-hammer pepperbox") in the United States was Ethan Allen, but this type of weapon was also produced in large quantities in England.

Some pepperboxes fired the lower barrel instead of the upper, such as the American Blunt & Syms, the English Cooper or the Belgian Mariette (with configurations between three and twenty-four barrels). Usually these employed an "underhammer" action, with the hammer mounted under the frame, behind the barrels, forward of the trigger (often a ring-trigger). Several other types of firing mechanisms exist, such as rotating internal firing pins (Rigby, Robbins and Lawrence, Comblain), rotating firing pins on a hammer (Sharps, Grunbaum) or multiple firing pins (Martin). During the early 1830s English gunsmith Joseph Manton offered a variant with a retractable knife blade, and pistols with up to 18 barrels. The Robbins & Lawrence pepperboxes of 1851–1854 had rifled barrels, a break action breechloading mechanism and an early safety catch, meaning that it was not necessary to disassemble the gun to reload it.

The flaw with the pepperbox design is that it becomes more front heavy if the length and number of barrels is increased, making accurate aiming difficult. With most types in particular those with rotating barrel clusters, it is almost impossible to aim beyond close range because the hammer is in the line of sight (some pepperboxes have a slot in the hammer through which one is supposed to aim), there is no place to put a frontsight (putting one for each barrel would only increase the weight of the front end and likely make drawing the weapon awkward), and the gun is too front heavy to permit quick and steady aiming. However, the primary market was for civilian self-defense, so its most common use was at close range. Common practice at the time, indeed, was not to aim pistols, but instead to "shoot from the hip", holding the gun low and simply pointing at the target's center of mass. Gunfights often happened at a very close range. With this use in mind, many pepperboxes, in fact, have smooth-bored barrels, even though rifling had been commonly used for decades by the time of their manufacture. In the Old West, large pepperboxes were favored by the gold prospectors of 1849, for protection against robbers, rival claimants and hostile native Americans. Both American and British made pepperboxes were also popular among gold miners in Australia as a cheaper alternative to the Colt Navy revolver, and several were used at the Eureka Stockade.

Multi shot percussion firearms were often considered dangerous because firing one powder charge could ignite the others (a "chainfire"), all at the same time, when proper care was not taken. This problem was largely eliminated by the introduction of nipple partitions, evident on later percussion revolvers, which largely shielded the percussion caps on neighbouring chambers from the flash struck by the weapon's hammer during firing. However this feature is rarely seen on pepperboxes, although some had the nipples placed in recesses or at right angles to each other to reduce the chance of a chainfire. A chainfire in a pepperbox would be far less dangerous than in a single barreled revolver because with a pepperbox, each of its bullets could freely exit its own dedicated barrel (essentially turning it into an impromptu volley gun). Similarly if a chamber was not in exactly the right position when the hammer hit the cap it would fire normally and safely, as opposed to a single barrelled revolver where a cylinder misaligned with the barrel when fired could cause a potentially explosive malfunction. This simplicity and safety helped the pepperbox survive after more modern revolvers came along, as well as keeping production costs a lot lower than revolvers with their more complex mechanisms.

Transitional revolver

A development from the pepperbox are the so called "transitional" revolvers. These weapons have a cut-down pepperbox cylinder firing through a single barrel. A transitional revolver is defined as a revolver (with barrel and cylinder) that does not have a cylinder stop, an early example being the Collier flintlock revolver of 1819.

It retained the pepperbox's caplock action but still had many deficiencies. The lack of an effective cylinder stop allowed a charge to be fired when the cylinder was not aligned with the barrel, resulting in an erratic shot possibly damaging the gun and even injuring the firer. While the shortened cylinder made loading easier the barrel was attached to the cylinder pin, over time this weakened the gun, decreasing its accuracy. In addition it lacked partitions between its nipples, risking similar chain-fires to the earlier pepperbox. This was exacerbated by the fact that the bar-hammers common on pepperboxes and transitional revolvers usually provided a weak blow, which meant that extra sensitive percussion caps were needed to ensure that the gun would fire, further increasing the risk of a chain-fire. Although later models were fitted with a shield to protect the user from cap fragments there was still a risk of being killed or maimed as a multiple discharge could cause the gun to explode.

Since the bullets didn't have to be rammed down from the muzzle but were loaded into the cylinder behind the barrel, they could be slightly larger than the bore, which facilitated the use of rifled barrels. Whereas most pepperboxes are smooth-bore, most transitionals are rifled.

Daniel Leavitt was the subject of a famous lawsuit after producing a transitional revolver in 1851 with an identical loading lever to the Colt Dragoon revolver. Guns of this type saw use in the Mexican War as an alternative to the Colt Dragoon revolver and the Colt Walker revolver, most notably by General Winfield Scott. A late example the Butterfield revolver of 1855 used a Maynard tape primer rather than percussion caps. 640 were issued to the US Army during the American Civil War, but the government canceled any further purchases when the pistols were found to be inferior to the cheaper Colt Navy revolver. Transitional revolvers and pepperboxes started disappearing gradually in the 1850s with the manufacture of true revolvers by Colt, Smith & Wesson, Webley, Adams, Rupertus and others.

Revival

The pepperbox experienced a kind of "revival" in the late 19th century as a short, easily concealable pocket pistol that used pinfire cartridges. The five barrel Feilitzenre pistol was almost accepted as the standard officer sidearm for the Swedish Army.

A special variation of this kind of sidearm, in which the shortness of the barrel cluster was fully used, is the Belgian Dolne M1869 Apache revolver. This weapon, allegedly popular among the Paris street gangs after whom it was named, was fitted with a folding blade and knuckle-duster. The pepperboxes from this period disappeared with the demise of the pinfire cartridge.

One of the more interesting pepperbox revolvers is the .22 Short, six barrel Remington Zig-Zag Derringer. Unlike the older single action designs, it had a double action ring trigger and could fire six shots as fast as one could pull the trigger. Guns of this type were prized by gamblers, in addition to the four barrel Christian Sharps derringer, because they could be easily concealed in a vest pocket and easily used for self-defense.

Modern use

The pepperbox design was used for a small number of weapon designs in the 20th century, most notably a six barrelled derringer in .22 caliber from Cobray.

During the 1960s an eight barrelled pepperbox shotgun, the Colt Defender Mark I, was designed by Robert Hillberg; but never went into production.

In the 1970s Heckler & Koch produced the five barrelled P11 pistol designed as a covert underwater firearm firing 7.62 X 36mm darts electrically.

The Osa is a Russian four barrelled pistol designed to fire a range of non-lethal and flare rounds from electrically-fired 18×45 mm cartridges.

The Reprringer is a design for a five barrelled 3D printed pepperbox sidearm in .22 LR, which received widespread media coverage.

3D printed pistols resembling the pepperbox have been allegedly downloaded and manufactured by drug dealers in the UK. A student from London named Tendai Muswere was the first person convicted in 2019 of printing a multi barreled derringer of this type, known as the Hexen.

Popular culture 
In the first season of Critical Role, and its animated adaptation The Legend of Vox Machina, the character Percival de Rolo III, played by Taliesin Jaffe, invented and wielded a pepperbox revolver.

See also

Gatling machine gun
Ripley machine gun
Derringer
Lancaster pistol

References

External links

Examples of pepperboxes
Patent for a 4 barrel pepperbox rifle

Guns of the American West
Black-powder pistols
Revolvers
Flintlock repeaters
Multiple-barrel firearms
American Civil War weapons
Revolvers of the United States
Victorian-era weapons of the United Kingdom